Brenda Zlamany is an American artist best known for portraiture that combines Old Master technique with a postmodern conceptual approach. She gained attention beginning in the 1990s, when critics such as Artforum's Barry Schwabsky, Donald Kuspit and John Yau identified her among a small group of figurative painters reviving the neglected legacies of portraiture and classical technique by introducing confrontational subject matter, psychological insight and social critique. Her early portraits of well-known male artists, such as Chuck Close and Leon Golub, reversed conventional artist/sitter gender and power dynamics; her later projects upend the traditionally "heroic" nature of portraiture by featuring underrepresented groups and everyday people. Zlamany has exhibited internationally at institutions including the Smithsonian National Portrait Gallery, Museum of Contemporary Art Taipei, National Museum, Gdańsk, and New-York Historical Society. Her work has been recognized with a Fulbright Fellowship, Pollock-Krasner Foundation Award, and commissions from Yale University, World Bank and The New York Times Magazine; it belongs to public collections such as the Neuberger Museum of Art and Virginia Museum of Fine Arts. Zlamany is based in Brooklyn, New York.

Early life and career 
Brenda Zlamany was born in 1959 in New York City and raised in Queens, New York. After a family move to Connecticut, she applied to and was accepted into the Educational Center for the Arts, an arts high school in New Haven; she attended from 1974 to 1977, living on her own in various informal arrangements. During that time, she worked for a city program painting murals, illustrated a children's book, and was invited to attend the Yale College Before College Program, where she studied printmaking, painting and anthropology. Following high school, she studied at Wesleyan University (BA, 1981), the Tyler School of Art in Rome, S. W. Hayter's Atelier 17 in Paris, and the Skowhegan School of Painting and Sculpture.

In 1984, Zlamany took advantage of a Jerome Foundation Fellowship and moved to New York City, working as a master printer with artists such as Julian Schnabel, Vija Celmins and Sol LeWitt, and making etchings at the Bob Blackburn Printmaking Workshop. After moving to Williamsburg, Brooklyn, she began painting and attracting attention with animal still lifes. Between 1984 and 1994, she was featured in solo exhibitions at Hallwalls and E. M. Donahue Gallery (New York), Sabine Wachters Fine Arts (Brussels) and Galerie Quintessens (Utrecht), in group shows at White Columns, Art in General and Artists Space, and alongside artists including Bruce Nauman and Andy Warhol, in shows at Jack Tilton and Blum Helman. In subsequent years, Zlamany has had solo exhibitions at the Stux and Jessica Fredericks galleries (New York), the Fine Arts Center (UMass) (2001) and Museum of Contemporary Art Taipei (2012), and appeared in group shows at the Museum of Contemporary Art Denver, National Portrait Gallery, and several European museums. She continues to live in Williamsburg with her daughter, Oona.

Work and reception
Critics note Zlamany's portraiture for its conceptual slant, postmodern interrogations of the male gaze, traditional subject matter, beauty and representation, and Old Master technique. John Yau and others connect her work, in sensibility if not style, back to figurative modernists such as Alice Neel, Otto Dix and Ivan Albright, contemporary painters like Vija Celmins, Chuck Close, Gregory Gillespie and Alex Katz that integrate elements of abstraction into representational work, and postmodern artists such as John Currin, Elizabeth Peyton and Lisa Yuskavage who have ushered in new, critical and democratic forms of portraiture in recent decades. Distinguishing her from artists that appropriate or parody classical technique, Donald Kuspit placed Zlamany amid a tendency he called "new Old Masterism" that sought "to restore the beauty lost to avant-garde innovation." Other reviewers, such as The New York Times''' Holland Cotter, have invoked painters such as Rembrandt, Zurbarán and Chardin in describing Zlamany's handling of color, surface and paint application.

Early animal still lifes
Zlamany first attracted notice for meticulously rendered paintings of animal carcasses (birds, blowfish, snakes, sharks, iguanas), isolated and floating ambiguously in dark, painterly abstract fields (e.g., Shark Head #2, 1992). She began this work in the mid-1980s as a way to connect to visceral experience and elements of art practice—painting, craft, beauty—that she felt women were discouraged from pursuing. Reviewers noted her mastery of academic glazing techniques, delicate sense of color and texture, and paint application suggestive of both Old Master and Abstract Expressionist technique;The New Yorker. "Brenda Zlamany," The New Yorker , December 21, 1998, p. 16, 18. in psychological terms, they described the paintings as "disquietingly seductive," vaguely allegorical, icon-like contemplations of life, death, desire and spirituality.Ebony, David. "Brenda Zlamany at Jessica Fredericks," Artnet, November 20, 1996.Heisler, Eva. "'New York Noir' / Allez les Filles," Dialogue, May–June 1995, p. 22. Janine Cirincione wrote that they "teeter on the edge of abstraction and representation, old master bravura and postmodern theory, between the seductive and the gruesome," with freewheeling art historical borrowings that challenged both traditional pictorial values and contemporary negations of representational work. Barry Schwabsky likewise noted the work's conceptual preference for investigating materiality and illusionism and art's "half-feared, half-desired" fascination with representation and beauty over realism. In a later series, Zlamany painted posed, live snakes that emphasized linear decoration, pattern and male sexuality while subverting traditional cultural associations of snakes with the feminine.

Portraiture
In 1992, Zlamany painted her first human portrait and exhibited it alongside animal still lifes, interested in how the out-of-fashion genre would be received. Positive response inspired her 1994 show, "Twelve Men and Twelve Birds," a deadpan pairing of dead bird and artist portraits (including Chuck Close, Glenn Ligon, Gary Stephan).Gilsoul, Guy. "Une portraitiste d’aujourd’hui," Le vif / L’express, March 31, 1995, p. 89. Writers described them as terse, moody, glowing likenesses that emerged from velvety black, reflective backgrounds and emphasized composition, surface and volume rather than personality or photographic reproduction.The New Yorker. "Brenda Zlamany," The New Yorker , October 17, 1994, p. 29.Herfield, Phyllis. "Brenda Zlamany: / E.M. Donahue," The New York Review of Art, December 1994, p. 21. Her 1995 show at Sabine Wachters featured portraits of the gallery's other artists—generally middle-aged, bald, male conceptual artists—that Guy Gilsoul called meticulously painted, inaccessible "mixtures of attraction, and repulsion, fascination and aversion." In conceptual terms, critics such as Robert C. Morgan deemed this work a provocative deconstruction that coaxed "exemplars of art world virility" into a passive role in order to glimpse male reality and sexual and power dynamics, reversing centuries of objectification of female subjects.Pozzi Lucio. "Che ve ne sembra dell’ America? Lettera da New York di Lucio Pozzi. L’artista e il suo doppio," Il giornale dell’arte, December 1994. John Yau described them as possessing a "disturbing eroticism" sealed off in dark anonymous space and embalming glazes that dissolved the subjects' power.

In the late 1990s and 2000s, Zlamany, continued painting portraits of male artists and other public figures, while expanding her practice to include a wider range of figurative subjects and a series of Southeast Asian landscapes.Tabios, Eileen. "How Painting Transcends Painting," Reviewny, February 15, 2001. Her multi-paneled "Color Studies" works configured monochrome panels and portraits (of Chuck Close, Evander Holyfield, and John Yau) mixed figuration and abstraction, riffing on modernist color theory, rectangles (e.g., the boxing ring), negative space, and Close's use of repetition and the grid. They emphasized the minimal nature of Zlamany's work, which had long eschewed architecture and landscape elements and iconographic cues in favor of composition, proportion, ground color and manner of representation as means of conveying narrative or psychological content. During this time, Zlamany also produced portraits of artists Leonardo Drew, David Humphrey, David Hockney, and Alex Katz among others; the latter two were National Portrait Gallery competition selections.

In 1998, Zlamany painted portraits of her pregnant sister and two sets of self-portraits, one nude and one in profiled poses recalling works by della Francesca; her 2007 show "Facing Family" featured portraits of her parents and daughter. Critics such as Donald Kuspit continued to note her confrontation with representational conventions and Old Master technique and devices in these works and the later Self-Portrait with Oona nursing (2003–4), a stark contemporary rendering of the Madonna and Child motif. They also noted her ability in these works to create narrative, context and inner presence.

"The Itinerant Portraitist"
Zlamany's international, multiyear project, "The Itinerant Portraitist" (2011– ), explores portraiture focused on nontraditional subjects: indigenous communities in Taipei, orphaned Emirati girls, taxicab drivers in Cuba, and nursing home residents in the Bronx.Jones, Mary "A Portrait a Day—and Back in the Day: A Studio Visit with Brenda Zlamany," Art Critical, December 14, 2015. Retrieved September 27, 2019. The series began with a Fulbright Grant-supported project in which she painted 888 watercolor portraits from direct observation of people in remote Taiwan, accompanied by her daughter, Oona, who is fluent in Mandarin; it was realized in the multimedia installation, "888: Portraits in Taiwan" (exhibited in Taipei and New York, 2012). In 2017, Zlamany painted 100 elderly residents of the Hebrew Home in the Bronx using a camera lucida; that work was exhibited at the Derfner Judaica Museum and documented in the collaborative video, 100/100 (2019, with composer Aaron Jay Kernis), which played several film festivals and won the Best Documentary Short prize at the Greenpoint Film Festival.

Portrait commissions
Zlamany has received portrait commissions from individuals, The New York Times Magazine, and institutions such as the World Bank and Yale University, among others. She produced portraits of Osama bin Laden (cover), Slobodan Milosevic and Mirjana Marković, Marian Anderson, and Jeffrey Dahmer for special issues of The New York Times Magazine. She won a national competition for her first Yale commission, Yale's First Women Ph.Ds., 1894 (2015), which commemorates the first seven women to earn Ph.D. degrees at the university. The painting involved extensive research on the women and late-19th century costuming, hairstyles and objects; its composition was developed through the use of paper cutouts of the women in various poses and relationships. The Davenport Dining Room Scene (2018) is a two-canvas group portrait of a departing college dean among a mix of eight professors, students, and university employees of the university that he had formed friendships with during several decades at the school.

Collections and recognition
Zlamany has been recognized with a Fulbright Fellowship (2011), awards from the Pollock-Krasner Foundation (2006), Peter S. Reed Foundation (2018) and New York Foundation for the Arts (1994), and artist residencies at Denali National Park, ADAH Abu Dhabi, Ucross Foundation, Yaddo, MacDowell Colony, Millay Colony for the Arts, and Triangle Arts Trust, among others.Yaddo. "Visual Artists," Guests. Retrieved September 27, 2019. Her work belongs to public art collections including those of the Cincinnati Art Museum, Neuberger Museum of Art, Museum Kaneko, Virginia Museum of Fine Arts, World Bank, and Deutsche Bank.

References

External links
Brenda Zlamany official website
Brenda Zlamany, The Itinerant Portraitist project site
Studio Visit with Brenda Zlamany, in Art CriticalInterview with Brenda Zlamany, Conversation Project NYC''

21st-century American painters
20th-century American painters
American women painters
Wesleyan University alumni
Skowhegan School of Painting and Sculpture alumni
1959 births
Living people
20th-century American women artists
21st-century American women artists
Painters from New York City